The Engineering Society of Buffalo, Inc. (ESB) was founded in 1894 by a civil engineer, George R. Sikes. Letters inviting practicing engineers were sent soliciting membership.  In November of that same year, a decision was made to form a "Society of Engineers"- in the committee room of the common council of the City of Buffalo. Membership has grown today to over 160 engineers in the Western New York area.

The organization took on a distinct and clear operating structure - as evidenced by drafting of a constitution & by-laws- which are still in existence today.The ESB was incorporated in 1920 and, in more recent years, was declared as a non-profit organization. Contributions to the society are tax deductible. Business development continues to be a major focus.

One of the most important aspects of the ESB is promoting the professional development of engineers in Western New York. This is done through a scholarship program and sponsoring of further education.

The ESB supports academically qualified graduating high school seniors majoring in engineering at either University at Buffalo, Buffalo State College and Erie Community College through the Scholarship Program. Since the inception of the scholarship awards in 1950, over 200 scholarships have been awarded. Total amount distributed is over $8,000 annually.  Scholarships are primarily funded by the Annual Scholarship Run held each August.

The ESB offers review courses for both the Fundamentals of Engineering (or EIT) exam as well as the Professional Engineering (PE) licensing exam- in all disciplines. Instruction is provided on a volunteer basis by member engineers with the appropriate license and training. Classes are held at the SUNY Buffalo, Amherst Campus.

References

External links
 Official ESB−Engineering Society of Buffalo website — current events, upcoming activities, and member news.

Engineering societies based in the United States
Organizations based in Buffalo, New York
Science and technology in New York (state)